John Lynch (born Lambeth 1735 – died Canterbury 1803) was an English churchman, Archdeacon of Canterbury from 1788 until his death on 1 May 1803.

The son of John Lynch (1697–1760), he was educated at Christ Church, Oxford, matriculating there in 1753, and graduating B.A. in 1757. He held livings at All Hallows, Bread Street and St Dionis Backchurch, both in the City of London.

References

1735 births
1803 deaths
Alumni of Christ Church, Oxford
Archdeacons of Canterbury
People from Lambeth